Angelika Kratzer is a professor emerita of linguistics in the department of linguistics at the University of Massachusetts Amherst.

Biography
She was born in Germany, and received her PhD from the University of Konstanz in 1979, with a dissertation entitled Semantik der Rede.  She is an influential and widely cited semanticist whose expertise includes modals, conditionals, situation semantics, and a range of topics relating to the syntax–semantics interface.

Among her most influential ideas are: a unified analysis of modality of different flavors (building on the work of Jaakko Hintikka); a modal analysis of conditionals; and the hypothesis ("the little v hypothesis") that the agent argument of a transitive verb is introduced syntactically whereas the theme argument is selected for lexically.

She co-wrote with Irene Heim the semantics textbook Semantics in Generative Grammar, and is co-editor, with Irene Heim, of the journal Natural Language Semantics.

Key publications 
Heim, Irene & Angelika Kratzer. 1998. Semantics in Generative Grammar. Wiley-Blackwell.
Kratzer, Angelika. 1977. What 'must' and 'can' must and can mean. Linguistics and Philosophy 1 (3): 337-355.
Kratzer, Angelika. 1981. The notional category of modality. In: Words, worlds, and contexts: New approaches in word semantics, ed. by HJ Eikmeyer and H. Rieser. Berlin: Walter de Gruyter, 38-74.
Kratzer, Angelika. 1995. Individual level predicates. In: The generic book, edited by Gregory N. Carlson and Francis J. Pelletier. Chicago University Press, 125-175.
Kratzer, Angelika. 1996. Severing the external argument from its verb. In: Phrase structure and the lexicon. Edited by J. Rooryck and L. Zaring. Kluwer/Springer, 109-137.
Kratzer, Angelika. 2012. Modals and Conditionals: New and Revised Perspectives. Oxford University Press.

See also 
 Formal semantics (linguistics)
 Generative grammar
 Modality (natural language)
 Modal logic

References

External links
 Angelika Kratzer's personal webpage
 

Linguists from the United States
Year of birth missing (living people)
Living people
Semanticists
University of Massachusetts Amherst faculty
Women linguists
Philosophers of language
Fellows of the Linguistic Society of America